Giba is a river of northern Ethiopia. It starts at the confluence of Genfel and Sulluh (which rises in the mountains of Mugulat) (3298 metres above sea level) and flows westward to the Tekezé River. Future Lake Giba will occupy the plain where Sulluh, Genfel and Agula'i Rivers meet, and hence be the future source of Giba River.

Hydrography 
It is a confined river, locally meandering in its narrow alluvial plain, with a slope gradient of 7 metres per kilometre. With its tributaries, the river has cut a deep gorge.

Tributaries
Main tributaries, from downstream to upstream, are
 Tanqwa
 Tsech'i River
 May Qoqah
 Arwadito
 Adawro River
 May Selelo
 Zikuli River
 Gra Adiam River, also called Bitchoqo River
 Zeyi River
 Inda Sillasie River
 May Zegzeg
 May Harena
 May Sho'ate
 May Be'ati River
 Addi Keshofo River
 May Gabat
 Inda Anbesa 
 Ruba Bich'i River
 Hurura
 Afedena River
 May Ayni
 Shimbula
 Ilala River
 Qarano River
 Agula'i River
 Genfel
 Sulluh
 Ch'eqofo River

Hydrology

Hydrological characteristics
The runoff footprint or annual total runoff volume is 558 million m³.
Peak discharges up to 1740 m³ per second occur in the second part of the rainy season (month of August) when there are strong rains and the soils are saturated with water in many places.
The percentage of total rainfall that directly leaves the catchment as storm runoff (also called runoff coefficient) is 8%.

The total amount of sediment that is transported by this river amounts to 3.96 million tonnes per year. Median sediment concentration in the river water is 10 grammes per litre, but may go up to 42 g/L. The highest sediment concentrations occur at the beginning of the rainy season, when loose soil and dust is washed away by overland flow and ends up in the river.
As such water contains many nutrients (locally it is called “aygi”), farmers estimate that it strengthens their cattle, which they will bring to the river. All in all, average sediment yield is 1065 tonnes per km² and per year. All measurements were done at a purposively installed stations, on Giba and Tanqwa rivers, just upstream of their junction, in the years 2006 and 2007.

Flash floods
Runoff mostly occurs in the form of high runoff discharge events that occur in a very short period (called flash floods). These are related to the steep topography, often little vegetation cover and intense convective rainfall. The peaks of such flash floods have often a 50 to 100 times larger discharge than the preceding baseflow. These flash floods mostly occur during the evening or night, because the convective rain showers occur in the afternoon.

Changes over time

Evidence given by  Italian aerial photographs of the catchment, taken in the 1930s show that 49% of the catchment was covered with woody vegetation (against 35% in 2014). This vegetation could slow down runoff and the runoff coefficient was smaller (5% in 1935 against 8% in 2014). As a consequence, discharges in the river were less and the river was narrower than today.
Up to the 1980s, there was strong pressure on the environment, and much vegetation disappeared. This river had its greatest discharges and width in that period.

The magnitude of floods in this river has however been decreased in recent years due to interventions in the catchment. At Gemgema,   Afedena, May Be'ati and on many other steep slopes, exclosures have been established; the dense vegetation largely contributes to enhanced infiltration, less flooding and better baseflow. Physical conservation structures such as stone bunds and check dams also intercept runoff.

Irrigated agriculture
Besides springs and reservoirs, irrigation is strongly dependent on the river’s baseflow. Such irrigated agriculture is important in meeting the demands for food security and poverty reduction. Irrigated lands are established in the narrow alluvial plains all along the river, mostly using pump irrigation. Very often tropical fruits are grown in these gorges as the climate is warmer than the overall surrounding highlands.

Transhumance towards the river gorge
The valley bottoms in the gorge of this river, for instance at Inda Mihtsun, have been identified as a transhumance destination zone.
Transhumance takes place in the summer rainy season, when the lands near the villages are occupied by crops. Young shepherds will take the village cattle down to the gorge and overnight in small caves. The gorges are particularly attractive as a transhumance destination zone, because there is water and good growth of semi-natural vegetation.

Boulders and pebbles in the river bed

Boulders and pebbles encountered in the river bed can originate from any location higher up in the catchment. In the uppermost stretches of the river, only rock fragments of the upper lithological units will be present in the river bed, whereas more downstream one may find a more comprehensive mix of all lithologies crossed by the river. From upstream to downstream, the following lithological units occur in the catchment.
 Phonolite plugs
 Upper basalt
 Interbedded lacustrine deposits
 Lower basalt
 Amba Aradam Formation
 Antalo Limestone
 Adigrat Sandstone
 Edaga Arbi Glacials
 Quaternary alluvium and freshwater tufa
Logically, in the uppermost stretches of the river, only the pebbles and boulders of the upper lithological units will be present in the river bed, whereas more downstream one may find a more comprehensive mix of all lithologies crossed by the river.

Natural boundary
During its course, this river three different district (“woreda”) borders. On the various parts:
 Upper Giba: border between Dogu’a Tembien and  Inderta
 Middle Giba: border between Dogu’a Tembien and Saharti Samre
 Lower Giba: border between Kola Tembien and Abergele (woreda)

Trekking along the river
Trekking routes have been established across and along this river. The tracks are not marked on the ground but can be followed using downloaded .GPX files.
 Trek 15, along the middle course of Giba
 Trek 22, across the Giba gorge  in Debre Nazret
 Trek G, across the Giba gorge  in Amanit
 Treks S1 and S2, across the Giba gorge  in Abergele (woreda)
In the rainy season, flash floods may occur and it is advised not to follow the river bed. Frequently, it is then also impossible to wade across the river.

See also 
 List of Ethiopian rivers

References

Rivers of Ethiopia
Dogu'a Tembien
Tigray Region